Community School of Naples (CSN), is an independent, college preparatory day school that was founded in 1982 by a group of parents seeking to establish a quality, independent school close to home.  Recruited by word of mouth, the original student body consisted of fewer than 50 students who began K-5 classes in rented accommodation in two churches in Naples.

History 
Sam Hazard was the first Head of School, and by 1984 CSN had grown to more than 90 students in K-8th grade.  Twenty-eight acres of land on Pine Ridge Road were donated that year, and $3 million raised in order to construct the first five classroom buildings.  These original buildings now form the heart of the modern-day Lower School division of CSN.

James Young became CSN's second Head of School in 1985, serving for one year.

In 1986 the School graduated its very first student, Evan Berlin, in a graduating class of one student.

James Landi became CSN's third Head of School in August of that year.  The high school was then discontinued for financial reasons, and for the next six years the School became a K-8 school once again.  New buildings continued to be constructed, and the CSN high school reopened in 1992, graduating its first full class of 19 students in 1996.  The Landi Media Arts Building (LMA) with a library, theatre, and other teaching rooms opened in 1997, followed by the current Middle School building in 2000. By this time the total enrollment of the School had risen to 500 students.

After 16 years’ service as Head, James Landi left the School in 2001 and John Zeller became CSN's fourth Head of School.  It was in this year that the Board of Trustees signed a contract to purchase an additional contiguous 84-acre tract of land to the immediate north of the existing campus to provide for future expansion.  The 2004–2005 school year saw the construction of a new Upper School academic building, a three-court, two-story Fieldhouse (today The Moe Kent Family Fieldhouse), and new athletic fields and tennis courts.  In 2006 the total student enrollment was around 800 students.  The Board made the decision to sell off 40 acres to a local developer, and this eventually became Manchester Square.  The proceeds enabled the School to begin a small endowment.

Following the worldwide financial crash of 2008, CSN's total enrollment fell below 700 students for the first time in some years.  The School began its International Program with five Chinese students directly enrolled from China, housed with host families from the School.  This proved successful, and the program has since developed to host an average of around 15 students per year.

John Zeller, having served 11 years as Head of School and 26 years at CSN in total, left the School in 2012.  Interim Head of School Dennis Grubbs took over in July 2012 while a worldwide search for the next Head of School was conducted.

The Humanities Wing of the Upper School was opened in the fall of 2012, and David Watson began his tenure as CSN's fifth permanent Head of School on February 1, 2013.

A new five-year Strategic Plan was launched in January 2014.  The International Program was expanded to include the new Global Exchange Program, which involved a number of sister-schools in Italy, Germany, Spain and China, with which CSN now conducts regular exchange trips.  Mandarin was added to the MS/US curriculum.  The Shea Memorial Amphitheater opened in August 2015.

The Student Union, a common gathering area for CSN students, opened in February 2017. The building houses the new Dining Hall with food service, modern facilities for Innovation, an Upper School study area, lecture hall, administrative office space, and a Leadership Room for both Board and student use. In 2022, construction on the new Lower School Dining Hall and Fitness Center was completed and both were opened to CSN students, faculty, and family.

Today the school enrolls more than 800 students each year, and occupies a campus of 77 acres with 24 buildings, including athletic fields and a swimming pool.  Essential elements of the School's educational program include a comprehensive curriculum, a gifted faculty and low student-teacher ratio (9:1).  One hundred percent of CSN graduates attend four-year colleges and universities.  Average AP scores place CSN consistently in the top ten schools statewide; average SAT scores in 2019 placed CSN as the 3rd best performing independent school in the state.

Accreditations 
CSN is accredited by the Florida Council of Independent Schools (FCIS), is a member of the National Association of Independent Schools (NAIS), is a member of School Year Abroad (SYA), a member of Global Education Benchmark Group (GEBG), the Global Access Members of European Council of International Schools (ECIS), is Accredited by AdvanceED and holds ratings as a top private school in Florida with NICHE.

Sports

Fall sports 
 cheerleading
 cross country
 football
 golf (boys and girls)
 swimming and diving
 girls volleyball
 sailing

Winter sports 
 boys and girls basketball
 cheerleading
 sailing
 boys and girls soccer

Spring sports 
 baseball
 boys and girls lacrosse
 softball
 boys and girls tennis
 track and field

References

High schools in Collier County, Florida
Educational institutions established in 1982
Buildings and structures in Naples, Florida
1982 establishments in Florida